A buoy is a floating device of many types and uses.

Buoy(s) may also refer to:

 Buøy, Hundvåg, Stavanger, Rogaland, Norway; an island
 Buøy IL, a sports club in Buøy, Hundvåg, Stavanger, Rogaland, Norway
 Buoys (album), a 2019 album by Panda Bear
 Buoy (horse) (1970–1984), a British thoroughbred racehorse
 Buoy (mascot), the mascot of the Seattle Kraken ice hockey team
 Buoy anti-tank obstacle, a British anti-armoured-vehicle obstacle type named "Buoy"

See also

 
 
 Buoy tender, a type of boat used to maintain buoys
 Jolly Buoy Island, Mahatma Gandhi Marine National Park, South Andaman, Andaman Islands, India
 Boy (disambiguation)
 Buy (disambiguation)
 Bouy (disambiguation)
 The Buoys (disambiguation)
 Bouy, a commune in northeast France